Sergei Gorbunov may refer to:
 Sergey Gorbunov, Soviet volleyball player who played at the 1991 Men's European Volleyball Championship
 Sergei Grigoryevich Gorbunov (b. 1987), Russian footballer